Roger Edward Broggie (October 2, 1908 – November 4, 1991) was an American mechanical engineer who worked with Walt Disney and the Walt Disney Company. He is considered the first Disney Imagineer.

Early life
Broggie was born in 1908, in Pittsfield, Massachusetts. He graduated from Mooseheart Child City's high school in the western suburbs of Chicago, Illinois in 1927. With vocational machine shop training, he moved to Los Angeles, California where he worked for companies such as Technicolor and Bell and Howell. He worked at General Service Studios with film industry pioneers including David O. Selznick and Charlie Chaplin.

Disney career
In 1939, he joined the Disney Studios as a precision machinist. Broggie's initial assignments included installing the multiplane camera at the new Burbank studio, working with Ub Iwerks on special effects. In 1949, Broggie worked with Walt Disney to create model trains for Disney's 1/2 mile-long Carolwood Pacific Railroad located in the backyard of Disney's home. Broggie is credited with supervising the building of the Lilly Belle, a one-eighth scale miniature working live steam locomotive named for Disney's wife, Lillian.

Promoted to head of the Disney Studios Machine Shop in 1950, Broggie became the transportation specialist. He created the special effects for the film 20,000 Leagues Under the Sea and as the plans for Disneyland were developed in the early 1950s, he oversaw development of the Santa Fe & Disneyland Railroad, the Disneyland Monorail, and the Matterhorn Bobsleds at Disneyland. He was instrumental in developing the mechanical aspects of all Disney attractions at Disneyland and Walt Disney World, including the Omnimover ride transit system (with co-developer, Bert Brundage).

He and his machine shop coworkers developed the first fully functioning Audio-Animatronic human figure in the form of a seated Abraham Lincoln in 1963. Between 1973 and 1975, Broggie worked on the EPCOT Center project at Walt Disney World Resort in Florida.

After retiring to Carmel, California, he continued to consult for Walt Disney Imagineering. He was named a Disney Legend in 1990 and died on November 4, 1991, at his home in Carmel.

Tributes

The Walt Disney World Railroad's (WDWRR) No. 3 locomotive was named after Broggie. During its rebuild, Broggie did not like the sound of the locomotive's original bell and commented that it "sounded like a hammer hitting an old frying pan." Per advice of Broggie, WDWRR locomotive foreman George Britton secretly swapped out the No. 3 locomotive's original bell with the Liberty Belle riverboat's bell. 

On October 21, 2003, Michael Broggie and Roger Broggie, Jr rededicated the No. 3 locomotive in honor of their father. It was the fourth and final locomotive to be overhauled at Tweetsie Railroad in Blowing Rock, North Carolina. Since 2010, overhauling services have moved to the Strasburg Rail Road in Strasburg, Pennsylvania.

On March 30, 2007, he was honored with a window on Main Street, U.S.A. at Disneyland. The text reads: "Can Do Machine Works / Mechanical Wonders / Live Steam Engines / Magical Illusions / Cameras / Roger Broggie, Shopmaster / Advisor to the Magic Makers".

See also
Chadwell O'Connor
Rail transport in Walt Disney Parks and Resorts

References

External links

The Roger E. Broggie

1908 births
1991 deaths
Disney people
Disney imagineers
People from Pittsfield, Massachusetts
People from Carmel-by-the-Sea, California